Milltown is a Gaelic Athletic Association club based in the Milltown area in County Galway, Ireland which was established in 1953. The Club is one of the longest established sides in Galway. Milltown are a Gaelic football club.

Twice winners of the Galway Senior Football Championship, Milltown made their first appearance in a county final in 20 years when they faced Killererin at Pearse Stadium in 2007, but were defeated by a scoreline of 1-09 to 0-10.

Former Texaco Footballer of the Year, Noel Tierney, one of the members of Galway's historic "3 In A Row" team, is one of Milltown's best known players.

Two Milltown players were part of the Galway Under 21 All-Ireland winning squad in 2002: Diarmaid Blake and John Devane. Three more Milltown players were part of the Galway Under 21 All-Ireland winning squad in 2005: Darren Mullahy, Matthew Flannery and Cathal Blake. In 2011, Mark Hehir won an All-Ireland medal as part of the victorious Galway Under 21 squad.

In 2008, the club was awarded a Special Achievement Award by Galway county board for its underage program.

Milltown is the second longest senior football team in Galway after Tuam Stars.

History
 The oldest record of a Milltown GAA Club dates back as far as 1888 when Milltown John O'Keanes (named after a local man who was forced to leave his native country on a Fenian emigrant ship in the late 1860s) played Dunmore McHales on 6 April, defeating them 0-4 to 0-1.

By 1901 there was a new club in existence, Milltown Erin's Hope. In a report of a match played on 17 August the Milltown side beat Tuam Emeralds 2-3 to 2-0. It also says that an unnamed Milltown captain called for the Harp for Erin as the referee conducted the toss-up leading to the newly named club.

It wasn't until 1953 that the club was re-established, originally called Milltown St. Malachy's. The first team to represent the newly founded club was a junior side that played Kilconly on 12 April 1953, however Kilconly won the game 2-3 to 0-3. On 17 May however,  in their second match, they defeated Cortoon Shamrocks in a league game 3-6 to 0-3 at Brownesgrove.

In 1953 they won their first trophy when they beat Ahascragh 1-7 to 2-1 in the Galway Junior North Board Championship Final Replay ( Drawing the first match with seven points each ), however they were stripped of their title and suspended for 12 months for fielding an illegal player, a County Longford man who worked as a barman in a pub in Vicar Street, Tuam.

It wasn't until 1961 that Milltown won their first Galway Junior County Championship making history having to win it twice. After winning the North Board final they went straight through to the County final defeating St. Grellan's, Ballinasloe by 6-8 to 1-2. They didn't play a semi-final as the opposition, Clonbur weren't able to field a team but after an objection, they were given a refixture which Milltown won by 0-10 to 0-2 on New Years Day 1962. This became the first GAA result to be announced on the new RTÉ television channel which was opened that same day.

Ten years later in 1971, they won their first Galway Senior Football Championship with only a panel of 17 men. They defeated Ballinasloe on a scoreline of 0-4 to 0-5 on 10 October in Tuam Stadium, led by captain Sean Brennan. Milltown would go on to reach the Connacht Senior Club Football Championship final that year, however; they were defeated by Claremorris.

A decade later, they won their second and last Senior County Championship, again beating Ballinasloe, with a scoreline of 0-11 to 2-3 on 22 November 1981 in Tuam Stadium. John Hehir captained the winning team.

In 2007, Milltown qualified for a Galway SFC final for the first time in twenty years. Killererin won the game by two points.

Honours
 Galway Senior Football Championship: 2
(1971, 1981)
Runners-up: 5 (1967, 1978, 1986, 1987, 2007)
 Connacht Senior Club Football Championship Runners-up:
(1971)
Galway Senior Football League: Division 1: 6
1975, 1986, 1992, 2011, 2012, 2013
 Galway North Board Under-21 'A' Football Championship: 3
(1990, 1991, 1992)
Runners-up: 2 (1989, 1993)
 Galway County Under-21 'A' Football Championship: 3
(1990, 1991, 1992)
 Galway North Board Minor 'A' Football Championship: 2
(1954, 1960)
 Galway County Minor 'A' Football Championship Runners-up: 3
(1960, 1976, 1988)
  Galway North Board Minor (U17) 'C' Football Championship: 1
(2022)
  Galway County Minor (U17) 'C' Football Championship: 1
(2022)
 Exiles Cup: 20

Ladies Football
 Intermediate All-Ireland Club 7-A-Side Shield: 2
 (2010, 2014)
Runners-Up: 1 (2012)
 All-Ireland Club 7-A-Side Junior Championship: 3
 (2006, 2007, 2022)
Runners-Up : 1 (2004)

Notable players
Noel Tierney
Joe Waldron
Gay McManus
Tomás Tierney
Pádraig Coyne
Diarmaid Blake

References

External links
 https://milltowngaagalway.ie
 Milltown GAA Club

Gaelic football clubs in County Galway
Gaelic games clubs in County Galway